Jerry Louis Latin (born August 25, 1953) is a former American football running back who played professionally for the St. Louis Cardinals of the National Football League (NFL).

Biography 
Latin was born on August 25, 1953 in Prescott, Arkansas, but he moved with his family to Rockford, Illinois at an early age. He graduated from Rockford East High School, in Rockford, and from college at DeKalb, Illinois, where he played college football for Northern Illinois University.

Latin was chosen by the St. Louis Cardinals in the eleventh round of the 1975 NFL Draft. Latin played four seasons with the Cardinals, from 1975 to 1978. He also traded to the Los Angeles Rams in 1978.

References

1953 births
Living people
American football running backs
Northern Illinois Huskies football players
St. Louis Cardinals (football) players
People from Prescott, Arkansas
Sportspeople from Rockford, Illinois
Players of American football from Illinois